Mary Harriet McGowan King (11 February 1884 – 27 June 1967) was a New Zealand teacher, principal, businesswoman and political activist. She was born in Oamaru, Otago, New Zealand.

Politics 
King was a founding member of the Social Credit Party and was president of the party from 1962 to 1963.

References

1884 births
1967 deaths
20th-century New Zealand women politicians
20th-century New Zealand politicians
New Zealand women in business
Schoolteachers from Dunedin
Social Credit Party (New Zealand) politicians
New Zealand women activists
Politicians from Dunedin
People educated at Waitaki Girls' High School
Unsuccessful candidates in the 1954 New Zealand general election
Unsuccessful candidates in the 1957 New Zealand general election